Trappin Ain't Dead is the debut studio album by American rapper Fredo Santana. It was released on October 31, 2013, by Fredo Santana's own label, Savage Squad Records. The album features production from Murda Beatz, Young Chop, Lex Luger and DJ Kenn (All Or Nothing/A.O.N). It features guest appearances from Kendrick Lamar, Chief Keef and Lil Herb (aka G Herbo), among others.

Background 
Santana initially announced the release of the album on Twitter, with a release set for Halloween 2013. The tracklist was also revealed through Santana's Twitter account on October 30, showing features from Kendrick Lamar, Chief Keef and Lil Herb, among others.

Singles 
The lead and only single from the album, "Jealous", which features fellow rapper Kendrick Lamar, was released on October 31, 2013.

Commercial performance 
Trappin Ain't Dead debuted at #45 on the Top R&B/Hip-Hop albums chart on December 7, 2013, and stayed on the chart for one week.

Track listing

References 

2013 debut albums
Fredo Santana albums
Albums produced by Young Chop